The Sonata for Violoncello and Piano, Opus 6, by Samuel Barber is a sonata for cello and piano.  It is in the key of C minor.

History
The sonata was composed between June and December 1932 during a trip to Europe as Barber was finishing his studies at the Curtis Institute of Music. The score is dedicated to Barber's composition teacher, Rosario Scalero, and was officially premiered on 5 March 1933 with the composer at the piano and his friend and colleague Orlando Cole as cellist, at a concert of the League of Composers in New York City. Together with the Music for a Scene from Shelley, Op. 7, this sonata won both a Pulitzer travel stipend and the Prix de Rome of the American Academy in Rome in 1935.

Analysis
The sonata is in three movements:

Allegro ma non troppo
Adagio (in combination with a scherzo)
Allegro appassionato.

Media

References
 

Compositions by Samuel Barber
Barber
1932 compositions